Rock Sound is a town and former district of the Bahamas. It corresponds roughly to the current district of South Eleuthera. At the 2010 census, the population was 961. As of 2012 it had a population of 1,075.

The town is served by Rock Sound International Airport.

References

Former districts of the Bahamas
Populated places in the Bahamas